River Eden may refer to:

United Kingdom

England
 River Eden, Cumbria
 River Eden, Kent

Scotland
 River Eden, Fife
 Eden Water, a tributary of the River Tweed

Wales
 Afon Eden, Gwynedd

Elsewhere
 Eden River (Dominica)

See also
Eden Valley (disambiguation)